Elvis Antonio Rivas Palacios (born February 19, 1987) is a Colombian football defender.

He was part of Cucuta 2006 Colombian 1st division Championship and helped Cucuta get to the semi finals of the Copa Libertadores 2007

Honors
 Champions Colombian Primera A, 2006 Deportivo Cucuta
 Semi Finalist of Copa Libertories with Cucuta in 2007

References

1987 births
Living people
Colombian footballers
Cúcuta Deportivo footballers
Atlético Bucaramanga footballers
Deportivo Pasto footballers
Colombian expatriate footballers
Expatriate footballers in Bolivia
Association football defenders
Association football forwards
People from Quibdó
Sportspeople from Chocó Department